Margaret of Sicily or Margherita di Sicilia-Aragona (1331 in Palermo – 1377 in Neustadt) was a Sicilian princess, daughter of the King Frederick III of Sicily and his wife Eleanor of Anjou. In 1348 she married Rudolf II, Count Palatine of the Rhine, and was Countess Palatine of the Rhine until 1353, year of the husband's death.

Life
Margaret was the youngest daughter of King Frederick II of Sicily-Aragon (1272-1337) and his wife Eleanore, daughter of Charles II of Anjou. Her parents resided in Palermo, where she presumably was born.

In 1348 Margaret married the widowed Count Palatine Rudolf II from the house of Wittelsbach, who lived in Neustadt an der Weinstraße.

In 1349 Rudolf II married his daughter from his first marriage, Anna von der Pfalz, to King Charles IV, one of the most important rulers of the late Middle Ages. Anna died in Prague in 1353. Count Rudolf finally retired because of increasing illness, and handed the government business over to his brother and successor Ruprecht, who in 1356 was able to acquire the Electorate for the Palatinate. Rudolf II was nicknamed the blind, because he had a serious eye disease and was blind in his last year of life.

The marriage of Rudolf II and Margaret of Sicily-Aragon remained childless.

Elizabeth of Portugal (1271-1336), Margaret's father's sister, is revered as a saint. Her mother's brother, Louis of Toulouse, is also one of the saints of the Catholic Church.

Death and commemoration
Pfalzgraf Rudolf II decreed that the church of Saint Ägidius (Giles) in Neustadt should be converted into a memoria—a place of prayer and commemoration—for the Wittelsbachs, and wished to be buried there.

After his death on October 4, 1353, he was buried according to his wishes in front of the altar of the Neustadt parish church of St. Giles.

In 1356 Elector Ruprecht I donated the Liebfrauen-Kollegiatstift Neustadt as memorial for his family, according to the will of his brother Rudolf II. He had the parish church of St. Ägidius rebuilt and extended to the east with a splendid choir. The chancel area of this new church, the present Neustadt collegiate church, was built in 1368 according to a column inscription.

The altar of the new church now moved a good way east and the square in front of the altar of the old parish church, where Rudolf II had been buried, was now at the transition from the nave to the new choir area. At this point, in 1377, the Countess Margaret of Sicily-Aragon was buried next to her husband Rudolf II. She had survived him by 24 years.

Margaret of Sicily-Aragon received a splendid Gothic epitaph. Because of her royal origin, she is depicted on it with a crown. The gravestone is now located on the far north wall of the catholic church area and is one of the sights in Neustadt. Her husband Rudolf II possessed a similarly ornate grave plate, which, however, has survived only badly damaged and is also located in the Catholic church section on the rear south wall, opposite to his wife.

The graves of Count Palatine Rudolf and Countess Margaret of Sicily-Aragon lie in the rear of the Catholic part of the church, about the center, but are split by the 1707/1708 dividing wall between the Protestant nave and Catholic choir. In 1906 they were opened and re-covered with modern stone slabs, but not marked in the floor.

Around 1910, city pastor Michael Glaser (1863-1915) erected four large statues of the Palatine rulers Rudolf II and Ruprecht I, and the women buried by their side Beatrix of Berg and Margaret of Sicily-Aragon. They were created by the Munich sculptor Hubert Netzer from white Kelheim limestone and are located on the northern and southern nave wall of the Catholic part of the church. The sculptures, in the historicist style, are modeled on ancient representations. The two statues of women and the figure of Count Palatine Rudolf II are based on the images on their epitaphs in the collegiate church.

References

House of Barcelona (Sicily)
Sicilian princesses
Nobility from Palermo
14th-century German women
14th-century German nobility
1331 births
1377 deaths
Daughters of kings